Surprise Valley is located about seven miles east of Landers or three miles west of Sunfair Heights in San Bernardino County, California. It is north of Joshua Tree National Park. The valley is an areal feature.

External links

Valleys of San Bernardino County, California
Valleys of California